Kazimierz Czarnecki may refer to:
 Kazimierz Czarnecki (weightlifter)
 Kazimierz Czarnecki (engineer)